The British Ecological Society is a learned society in the field of ecology that was founded in 1913. It is the oldest ecological society in the world. The Society's original objective was "to promote and foster the study of Ecology in its widest sense" and this remains the central theme guiding its activities today. The Society had, circa 2013 around 4,000 members of which 14% are students. Of its members,  42% are outside the United Kingdom, in a total of 92 countries.  The head office is located in London.

History 

The Society evolved out of the British Vegetation Committee, which was founded in 1904 to promote the survey and study of vegetation in the British Isles.  This initiative was in turn the outcome of what many historians perceive to have been the emergence of modern ecology in the 1890s.  The British Ecological Society's inaugural meeting was held at University College London on 12 April 1913 and was attended by 47 members. Sir Arthur Tansley became the first President and the first issue of Journal of Ecology was printed in time for the meeting.

In its early days the society shared the London offices of The Linnean Society.

Publications 

Publication of scientific journals is a principal activity. The Journal of Ecology was first published in 1913 in time for the inaugural meeting of the Society, followed by the Journal of Animal Ecology (1932), Journal of Applied Ecology (1962), Functional Ecology (1987), and Methods in Ecology and Evolution (2010). Members can subscribe to these journals at a low cost. The Society also partners with Wiley-Blackwell on the open access journal Ecology and Evolution.

Meetings 
The Society also runs several major scientific meetings for ecologists each year. The Annual Meeting currently attracts 1,200 delegates each year and provides the opportunity for ecologists to present papers and posters on a wide variety of topics; an important element has always been the active participation of research students. There is an increasing number of delegates from overseas, principally Europe. It is Europe's largest annual meeting of ecologists. Since 1960 the Society has run an Annual Symposium and published a volume of its papers. It supports a range of other specialist meetings, workshops, training events and field meetings.

Presidents

References

External links 
 

British biology societies
British ecologists
Ecology organizations
Organisations based in London
Professional associations based in the United Kingdom
Scientific organizations established in 1913
1913 establishments in the United Kingdom